, born , was a Japanese entrepreneur who founded the company that is now known as Nintendo.  Yamauchi lived in Kyoto, Japan and had a wife and a daughter, Tei Yamauchi, who later married Sekiryo Kaneda.

Before Nintendo 
Fusajiro Fukui was born on 22 November 1859, as the oldest son of Sosuke Fukui. Working at Haiko Cement Company, Fukui would receive the surname Yamauchi upon being adopted by Naoshichi Yamauchi in 1872.

Nintendo Koppai
On 23 September 1889, Fusajiro Yamauchi opened the first Hanafuda (flower cards) card shop called "Nintendo Koppai", during a time when the Japanese government was banning playing cards from the hands of the public, due to them being tied to gambling, with the exception of Yamauchi's playing cards. With the huge success he had in selling these cards, he rapidly began expanding and opened another card shop in Osaka. He later went on to create more card games.

Retirement and death
Fusajiro departed from the company in 1929, leaving his son-in-law Sekiryo Kaneda (whose name had changed to Sekiryo Yamauchi) in charge of the company. Fusajiro remained uninvolved in the business for the remainder of his life until he died of a stroke on January 1, 1940, in Kyoto. Fusajiro's great-grandson, Hiroshi Yamauchi, took over Nintendo in September 1949 and ran the company for 53 years, transforming it from a card game company into a multibillion-dollar video gaming company and global conglomerate.

References

External links
 Play

1859 births
1940 deaths
19th-century Japanese businesspeople
20th-century Japanese businesspeople
Nintendo people